Lamine Bangura (born 18 April 1972) is a Sierra Leonean footballer. He played in seven matches for the Sierra Leone national football team from 1994 to 1998. He was also named in Sierra Leone's squad for the 1996 African Cup of Nations tournament.

References

1972 births
Living people
Sierra Leonean footballers
Sierra Leone international footballers
1996 African Cup of Nations players
Place of birth missing (living people)
Association football defenders